The Iran women's national under-16 basketball team is the national basketball team of Iran for Junior Women, governed by the Islamic Republic of Iran Basketball Federation.
It represents the country in international under-16 women's basketball competitions.

The team participated for the first time during the 2017 FIBA Under-16 Women's Asian Championship in India, wherein they finished fourth in Division B.

FIBA Asia Under-16 Championship for Women record 
2017: 12th

References

Women's national basketball teams
Basketball
Women's national under-16 basketball teams